Hewster is a surname. Notable people with the surname include:

John Hewster, MP City of London (elections to the Parliament of England)
Adam Hewster, MP for Stafford (UK Parliament constituency)

See also
Fewster
Hester